Cameraria palawanensis is a moth of the family Gracillariidae. It is known from Palawan, Philippines.

The wingspan is 3.9-4.1 mm.

The larvae feed on Derris elliptica. They mine the leaves of their host plant. The mine has the form of a blotch mine occurring on the lower side of the leaf, usually placed along margins or rarely in the disc between two lateral veins. It is whitish in colour and slightly tentiformed in mature condition. The parenchymal tissues attached to the upper surface of the mine are incompletely eaten, giving a mottled appearance. Pupation takes place inside the mine-cavity within a roughly spun, whitish cocoon.

References

Cameraria (moth)
Moths described in 1995

Moths of the Philippines
Leaf miners
Taxa named by Tosio Kumata